Dmitry Shnayder (born 30 May 1976) is a Kyrgyzstani former athlete. He competed in the men's javelin throw at the 2000 Summer Olympics.

References

External links
 

1976 births
Living people
Athletes (track and field) at the 2000 Summer Olympics
Kyrgyzstani male javelin throwers
Olympic athletes of Kyrgyzstan
Place of birth missing (living people)